Robert Stephen Mallard (born 19 May 1992) is an English actor from Manchester, England, best known for playing Daniel Osbourne in the long-running ITV soap opera Coronation Street.

Career
On 14 September 2016, it was announced that Mallard had been cast in Coronation Street as Ken Barlow's (William Roache) youngest son Daniel Osbourne, being the third actor to play the role after Lewis Harney and Dominic Holmes, respectively. Mallard said, "It feels great to be starting work on Coronation Street and I'm looking forward to getting to know everyone. I grew up watching Coronation Street, so the chance to be in it, especially playing a part like Daniel, is very exciting." Producer Kate Oates said, "Daniel is a different Barlow altogether, more sensitive and bookish, he is clearly a chip off the old block, but there is more to Ken's youngest son than meets the eye. Rob is a talented young actor who is perfect for the role". In June 2017, Mallard won the Best Newcomer award at the 2017 British Soap Awards for his portrayal of Daniel.

Personal life
Mallard is gay. He came out publicly in 2017 in an interview with Gay Times magazine and revealed that his family were really supportive of him when he came out to them at the age of 17. He added that he "never planned to keep it quiet" with his only concern being that "if I'm with a female character, will an audience who knows I'm gay in real life believe it? But that was just my own fears because I do believe they will." Mallard entered a relationship with his Coronation Street co-star, Daniel Brocklebank, who plays Billy Mayhew, in May 2017. The couple split up that July, but remained good friends.

During an appearance on ITV's This Morning in March 2018, Mallard revealed that he suffers from an essential tremor, a neurological disorder that causes involuntary shaking. He had previously appeared on the show in January 2018 where, after his appearance, there were numerous comments made on social media about his demeanour, especially his shaking, with some accusing him of being drunk. He admitted that he has been suffering from the condition for nearly a decade.

Filmography

Awards and nominations

References

External links
 

1992 births
Living people
Male actors from Manchester
English male soap opera actors
English gay actors